Zachary Paul Piller (born May 2, 1976) is an American former college and professional football player who was a guard in the National Football League (NFL) for eight seasons during the late 1990s and 2000s.  Piller played college football for the University of Florida, where he was a member of a national championship team in 1996.  Thereafter, he played professionally for the Tennessee Titans of the NFL.

Early years 

Piller was born in St. Petersburg, Florida. but primarily grew up in Tallahassee, Florida and attended Lincoln High School where he was a starting offensive lineman for the Lincoln Trojans high school football team.

College career 

Piller initially accepted an athletic scholarship to attend Georgia Tech in Atlanta, Georgia, where he played for the Georgia Tech Yellow Jackets football team.  After his freshman year ended, he transferred to the University of Florida in Gainesville, Florida, and played for coach Steve Spurrier's Florida Gators football team from 1996 to 1998.  Piller was a sophomore letterman on the 1996 Gators squad that defeated the in-state rival Florida State Seminoles in the Sugar Bowl to win the national championship.  As a senior team captain in 1998, he was a first-team All-Southeastern Conference (SEC) selection.

Piller graduated from the University of Florida with a bachelor's degree in exercise and sport science in 2006.

Professional career 

After playing eighty-seven games for the Titans (and starting in fifty-eight of them), Piller was released by the team on February 20, 2007.

Piller was signed by the Detroit Lions on March 23, 2007; he was released on May 3.  Piller signed with the New York Giants on June 7, 2007, only to be released again on September 2.  After spending two seasons out of football, Piller was drafted by the Florida Tuskers of the United Football League (UFL) in the UFL Premiere Season Draft in 2009.  He signed with the team on August 17, but was released before the season began.

See also 

 Florida Gators football, 1990–99
 Georgia Tech Yellow Jackets
 History of Tennessee Titans
 List of Florida Gators in the NFL Draft
 List of University of Florida alumni

References

Bibliography 

 Carlson, Norm, University of Florida Football Vault: The History of the Florida Gators, Whitman Publishing, LLC, Atlanta, Georgia (2007).  .
 Golenbock, Peter, Go Gators!  An Oral History of Florida's Pursuit of Gridiron Glory, Legends Publishing, LLC, St. Petersburg, Florida (2002).  .
 Hairston, Jack, Tales from the Gator Swamp: A Collection of the Greatest Gator Stories Ever Told, Sports Publishing, LLC, Champaign, Illinois (2002).  .
 McCarthy, Kevin M.,  Fightin' Gators: A History of University of Florida Football, Arcadia Publishing, Mount Pleasant, South Carolina (2000).  .
 Nash, Noel, ed., The Gainesville Sun Presents The Greatest Moments in Florida Gators Football, Sports Publishing, Inc., Champaign, Illinois (1998).  .

1976 births
Living people
American football offensive tackles
American football offensive guards
Detroit Lions players
Florida Gators football players
Florida Tuskers players
Georgia Tech Yellow Jackets football players
New York Giants players
Players of American football from Tallahassee, Florida
Players of American football from St. Petersburg, Florida
Tennessee Titans players